The Bronx Children's Museum is a children's museum founded in 2005. Its  exhibition space is located in Mill Pond Park in the South Bronx, New York City. The Museum provides ongoing in-school, afterschool and summer enrichment programming throughout the borough at schools, community based organizations, shelters, libraries, local festivals and parks. Since 2011, the Museum has offered programming out of its Museum On The Go! bus, also known as the "purple bus". The museum reaches about 10,000 people per year through the purple bus. Upon completion, its primary exhibition space will be located on the second floor of the Power House building in Mill Pond Park.

Among the museum's supporters are Supreme Court Justice Sonia Sotomayor and former Sesame Street star Sonia Manzano, both regular participants of the museum's "Dream Big" summer program. Manzano has also written a children's book for the museum: The Lowdown on the High Bridge about the nearby High Bridge, which straddles the East River, and provided water to Manhattan from the old Croton Aqueduct. Other celebrities associated with the museum include Kerry Washington, and Chazz Palminteri, both honorees at the museum's annual galas, and Sunny Hostin, who serves on the museum's board of directors. 

The groundbreaking ceremony for the exhibition space was held on July 12, 2017. The permanent building was opened to the public on December 3, 2022.

See also 
 List of children’s museums in New York City
 Brooklyn Children's Museum
 Children's Library Discovery Center
 Children's Museum of Manhattan
 Children's Museum of the Arts
 Staten Island Children's Museum

References 

Children's museums in New York City
Museums in the Bronx
Concourse, Bronx
Museums established in 2005
2005 establishments in New York City